Hovea montana, commonly known as alpine hovea,  mountain hovea or alpine rusty-pods, is a flowering plant in the family Fabaceae, and is endemic to Australia. It is a small shrub with narrow leaves and purple pea flowers.

Description
The stems and branches are thickly covered with soft, loosely flattened hairs. The upper surface smooth and hairless, the lower surface is thickly covered with fine, soft hairs.

Taxonomy and naming
Hovea montana was first formally described in 1988 by J.H.Ross and the description was published in Muelleria. The specific epithet (montana) refers to mountains or coming from mountains.

Distribution and habitat
Alpine rusty-pods is mostly found in open heath, woodlands and grassy situations at higher altitudes in New South Wales, Victoria and Tasmania.

References

montana
Flora of New South Wales
Flora of Tasmania
Flora of Victoria (Australia)